To the Death is a 1993 South African martial arts film directed by Darrell Roodt and starring John Barrett, Michel Qissi, and Robert Whitehead. It is the official sequel to the 1991 film American Kickboxer.

Plot
Professional kickboxing champion Rick Quinn has announced his retirement from the sport. Willard, the one time reporter he could not stand, has now become good friends with him and Quinn plans to live quietly with his pregnant wife Carol. However, one person unhappy with the retirement is Jacques Denard, who has wanted revenge on Quinn from their previous fight. Denard wanted to fight Quinn for the championship and now he finds that chance gone as Quinn has retired. When Denard shows up at Quinn's house to confront him, he is forced to leave at gunpoint by Carol.

Meanwhile, Quinn has attracted the attention of Dominique Le Braque, a rich businessman and lover of fights. As a fight promoter, he stages underground fights in which the loser finds himself shot in the head by the referee after the match is over. When Le Braque attempts to woo Quinn to fight for him, Quinn refuses as he tells him he is done as a professional. To ensure Quinn does join him, Le Braque hires some men to plant a car bomb, killing Carol and their unborn child. The incident destroys Quinn mentally to the point where despite help from Willard, Quinn has turned to alcoholism. He thinks Denard was the one who is responsible for killing Carol and in a drunken rage, confronts him and serves a three-month jail sentence for drunken assault. Le Braque bails Quinn out.

Deciding with nothing left to lose, Quinn takes up Le Braque's offer and is forced to stay at his mansion and land, where he begins to train. He also gets attention from Le Braque's wife Angelica, who slowly begins to tire of her husband's business overshadowing their marriage. When Quinn has his first fight and wins, he learns the horrid truth about what happens to the losers and he demands to leave. However, knowing he has been trapped, Quinn has no choice but to continue winning to keep himself alive. Eventually, he begins an affair with Angelica, which much to Le Braque's chagrin, gives the businessman a good idea. Quinn soon finds he has a familiar face as an opponent, Denard. Quinn attempts to snap some sense into Denard about what happens to the loser. Finally realizing it himself, Denard helps Quinn and together, they begin to take on Le Braque's men. When Le Braque points his gun at Quinn, Angelica shoots Le Braque, killing him.

Cast
 John Barrett as Rick Quinn
 Michel Qissi as Jacques Denard
 Robert Whitehead as Dominique Le Braque
 Michele Bestbier as Angelica Le Braque
 Ted Le Plat as Willard
 Greg Latter as Roger
 Norman Antsey as Tony
 Claudia Udy-Harris as Carol Quinn
 Nick Lorentz as Compere
 Charles Comyn as Bob
 Danny Keough as Hank
 Len Sparrowhawk as Solly
 Tyrone Stevenson as Legansi
 Leonard Nketsi as Sobah
 Kiki Architto as Trokowsky
 Dudley Du Plessis as Sang Lo & Sayan
 Neville Thomas as Englishman 
 Grant Sammons as American Kickboxer
 Lazlo Fagyas as Thai Kickboxer
 Rudi Strydom as Denard's Spar Partner
 Graham Press as The Prince
 Annabella Forbes as Roger's Girlfriend
 Barbora Tellinger as Manageress
 Vanessa Cooke as Whore

Production
The film was shot in South Africa in 1992. The film has been considered an unusual production for director Roodt, who before this film had just earned major credentials after directing the film Sarafina!.

Release
The now defunct Cannon Video released the film on VHS on 13 October 1993.

References

External links
 

English-language South African films
1993 martial arts films
Golan-Globus films
1990s English-language films
South African action films